Cluedo – Das Mörderspiel is an interactive crime show by the private broadcaster Sat.1 based on the world-famous detective board game Cluedo. The Australian version of the game show of the same name, which was shown on the Nine Network channel from 1992 to 1993, served as the template for the twelve German episodes.

In Germany, the show was moderated by Gundis Zámbó and initially broadcast on Thursdays at 8:15 p.m. However, due to low ratings, those responsible took the show out of the program after only seven episodes, in order to broadcast the remaining five episodes later in the summer on Saturday afternoons. The music of the show was composed by Martin Böttcher .

Development 
The German version called Cluedo – Das Mörderspiel [de] lasted for one or two seasons in 1993. It was created by Stefan Fuchs and shown on private broadcaster Sat.1. It was narrated by Klaus Kindler and hosted by Gundis Zambo. It was created at a time when the young television station wanted to attract attention and forge its own identity, and therefore sought out fresh, new ideas and talent. The music of the show was composed by Martin Böttcher. The series is set in Schloss Leonberg (Castle Leonberg), located at the real Sünching Castle near Regensburg

The scene of all criminal cases was always Leonberg Castle, which in reality was Sünching Castle near Regensburg. In each episode, potential crime scenes included: drawing room, dining room, library, billiard room, study, and kitchen. Both the six crime scenes and the six suspects remained the same in each episode, only the crime weapons and crime motives varied regularly. The show was an innovation on German television at the time. Each episode is 50 minutes long. While initially broadcast on Thursdays at 8:15 p.m, due to weak ratings, the show was taken off air after only seven episodes, in order to broadcast the remaining five episodes later in the summer on Saturday afternoon.

Plot and gameplay 
While the gameplay is based on Australia's instead of Britain's, where the audience interviews the suspects instead of celebrity teams, and are playing for a holiday if they solve the case. The schedule of the program provided that first a short film was shown, which represented the arrival of an uninvited guest at the castle and the associated crime motives of the six suspects. After that, only the studio audience could take part in the clarification of the case and question the suspects, who had also gathered in the studio, about what had happened and make assumptions.

Between the interrogations there was always a switch back to Leonberg Castle, where Chief Inspector Taller, played by Heinz Weiss, which resolved the murder case in several stages and flashbacks. At the end of each broadcast, the perpetrator finally made a confession, which answered all outstanding questions about the murder. Then the winner, who was the first in the studio to come up with the right combination of perpetrator, murder weapon and crime scene, was determined from the audience. The prize was a flight to the Dominican Republic, the Balearic Islands or the Canary Islands.

The 6 suspects were Klaus Barner (Pfarrer Clemens Grün), Oberst Friedrich Wilhelm von Gatow (Horst Frank), Gloria Thorbach (Cay Helmich), Peter Blohm (Till Topf), Caronin Elisabeth von Porz (Christine Wodetzky), and Helene Weiss (Inge Wolffberg). Crime scenes in each episode were the following: salon, dining room, library, billiard room, study and kitchen. Later in the scenario, after the murder has occurred, the Inspector Hauptkommissar Rolf Taller (Hanz Weiss) appears to investigate the murder, thereby revealing more information.

Episodes 
 Künstlerpech (28 Jan. 1993)
 Schnüffler leben gefährlich (4 Feb. 1993)
 Der letzte Kuss (11 Feb. 1993)
 Tödliches Training (18 Feb. 1993)
 First Lady (4 Mar. 1993)
 Ein Engel kommt selten allein (11 Mar. 1993)
 Eine heiße Story (1993)
 Stimmen aus dem Jenseits (1993)
 Satans Sänger (1993)
 Blau ist dicker als Wasser (1993)
 Machtwechsel in Schloß Leonberg (1993)
 Der falsche Gast (1993)

Critical reception 
Tagesspiegel said Hanz Weiss played a character the audience could trust. Quotenmeter thought it was one of the "innovative..crazy...kitschy tasteless...unconventional" shows that Stefan Fuchs brought to Sat.1 during his tenure, which "often developed into big audience favourites". MGTV hosted the show on its site in 2013, and wrote "Well-known actors were there. However, the format was not particularly successful."

References

External links
 German Cluedo Das Mörderspiel TV Series Press Clippings: Christine Wodetzky, Horst Frank, Cay Helmich, Till Topf, Inge Wolffberg, Klaus Barner, Heinz Weiss, Gundis Zambo
 Photos 

German television series